Alexander Ivanovich Bodunov (3 June 1951 – 11 May 2017) was a professional ice hockey player who played in the Soviet Hockey League.

He played for Krylya Sovetov Moscow.  He also played for the Soviet team during the 1972 Summit Series against Canada and was a two-time world hockey champion in the USSR national team (1973, 1974).

External links
 
 Summit Series bio

1951 births
2017 deaths
Soviet ice hockey players
Ice hockey people from Moscow
HC CSKA Moscow players
Krylya Sovetov Moscow players
HC Spartak Moscow players
Russian ice hockey coaches